Arun Bannerjee is an Indian Bengali film actor.

Filmography

Actor
 Herogiri (2015) 
 Bhroon (2013)
 Canvas (2013)
 Jodi Hridoye Lekho Naam (2013)
 Kartiker Biye (2013)
 Surjo - The King (2013)
 Deewana (2013)
 Idiot (2012)
Challenge 2 (2012) 
 Macho Mustanaa (2012)
 Lorai (2011)
 Aami Aachi Sei Je Tomar (2011)
 Apon Shatru (2011)
 Peeriti Kanthaler Aantha (2011)
 Jor Jar Muluk Tar (2010)
 Love Circus (2010)
 Soldier (2010)
 Aahuti (2010)
 Pratidwandi (2010)
 Rajodrohi (2009)
 Dujone (2009)
 Neel Akasher Chandni (2009)
I Love You (2007) 
 Priyotama (2006)
 Raju Uncle (2005)
 Sathi Aamar (2005)
 Surya (2004)
 Mon Jake Chay (2004)
 Sagar Kinare (2004)
 Shakti (2004)
 Deba (2002)
 Tantrik (2002)
 Malabadal (2001)
 Nodir Pare Aamar Bari (2001)
 Debanjali (2000)
 Joy Maa Durga (2000)
 Parichay (2000)
 Swashurbari Zindabad (2000)
 Jugabatar Loknath (1999)
 Jamaibabu (1996)

References

External links
 
 Arun Bannerjee in Gomolo

Living people
Indian male film actors
Male actors in Bengali cinema
Bengali Hindus
Year of birth missing (living people)